Semarak Football Club also known as Semarak FC, is a Malaysian football club based in PULAPOL Jalan Semarak, Kuala Lumpur, Malaysia. They currently play in the third-tier division in Malaysian football, the Malaysia M3 League.

History
Semarak Football Club is a club founded in 2019 in Jalan Sultan Yahya Petra, Kuala Lumpur (Jalan Semarak), Kuala Lumpur and the first time participated in 2020 Malaysia FA Cup preliminary round but lost to Gamestop FC 1–0.

The club also will make its debut at the Malaysian football league in the 2020 season.

Season by season record
Updated on 8 June 2020.

Notes:'

   2020 Season cancelled due to the 2020 Coronavirus Pandemic, no promotion or league title was awarded although this is now subject to a possible legal challenge

Players

First-team squad

Management team

Club personnel

Honours

Domestic competitions

League

References

External links
Official Facebook Page

Malaysia M3 League
Football clubs in Malaysia